Gwendolyn is a feminine given name, a variant spelling of Gwendolen (perhaps influenced by names such as Carolyn, Evelyn and Marilyn). This has been the most popular spelling in the United States.

Notable people called Gwendolyn/Gwendoline
Gwendolyn B. Bennett (1902–1981), American writer
Gwendolyn Black (1911–2005), Canadian musician, educator and activist
Gwendolyn Bradley, American soprano
Gwendolyn T. Britt (1941–2008), American Democratic politician
Gwendolyn Brooks (1917–2000), American poet
Gwendoline Christie, British actress
Gwendolyn Faison, American Democratic politician
Gwendolyn Audrey Foster, American professor of English and film studies
Gwendolyn Garcia (born 1955), Filipino politician
Gwendolyn Graham (born 1963), American serial killer
Gwendolyn Holbrow (born 1957), American artist
Gwendolyn L. "Gwen" Ifill (1955–2016), American journalist
Gwendolyn King, American businesswoman
Gwendolyn Knight (1914–2005), American sculptor
Gwendolyn Lau, American voice actress
Gwendolyn Lycett, British figure skater
Gwendolyn MacEwen (1941–1987), Canadian novelist and poet
Gwendolyn Masin (born 1977), Dutch-born violinist
Gwendolyn Osborne (born 1978), British model and actress
Gwendolyn Rutten, Belgian politician
Gwendolyn Sanford, American singer-songwriter
Gwendolyn Zepeda (born 1971), American author

Fictional characters
Dark Sun Gwyndolyn is a character in the 2011 video game Dark Souls
Gwendolyne Maxine "Gwen" Stacy, a supporting character in the Spider-Man comic book series
Gwendolyn "Winnie" Cooper, a central character in the American television series The Wonder Years (1988–1993)
Gwen Cooper, a fictional character in the BBC science-fiction television programme Torchwood
Gwendolyn "Gwen" Winthrop, a witch in the American soap opera Passions (1999–2008)
Gwendolyn, one of the family's pursuers in Saga comic book series
Gwendolyn, a were-wyrm in the DLC "Desolation of Mordor" of Middle-earth: Shadow of War (2017)
Gwendolyn Morgan of the Holyhead Harpies, mentioned in Quidditch Through the Ages (2001)
Gwendolyn, a valkyrie, one of the protagonists in the video game Odin Sphere (2007)
Gwendolyn Pierce, a character in the American sitcom television series Charles in Charge
Gwendolyn "Gwen" Tennyson, the cousin of Ben Tennyson on the Cartoon Network's media franchise Ben 10.
Gwendolyn Shepherd, main character in Kerstin Gier's Ruby Red and sequels novels.
Gwendolyn, a Roman centurion, a minor character in Rick Riordan's 2011 fantasy novel The Son of Neptune.
"Gwen" (Guinevere), a main character in the television series Merlin.
Gwendolyn Lancaster, main character in Jim Butcher’s The Aeronaut's Windlass first book of the Cinder Spires series
Gwendolyn "Gwen" Poole, the title character of the comic book series Unbelievable Gwenpool.

See also
Gwen (given name)
Gwendolen
Gwendoline

References

Given names